K. P. Unnikrishnan (born 20 September 1936) is an Indian former politician, writer, Union Minister and parliamentarian of Vatakara constituency.

Life

K. P. Unnikrishnan was born on 20 September 1936 in a family from Malabar Coast. His father's name was E. Kunhikannan Nair. He was educated at the Madras Christian College, Chennai. He completed his law also from Chennai. He was associated with Socialist Party and Praja Socialist Party during this period. In the 1960s, he joined Indian National Congress and became a member of the All India Congress Committee in 1962.

He used to write articles for the Mathrubhumi and other periodicals as special correspondent. He entered into electoral foray when he first represented Vatakara constituency in 1971 as an Indian National Congress candidate. He remained unbeaten in the next five Lok Sabha polls (1977, 1980, 1984, 1989, 1991) despite switching over to the Indian National Congress (U) in 1980 and later to Indian Congress (Socialist) in 1984. In the period 1981–84, he was the leader of Congress (Secular) in the parliament. In the period 1980–82, he was also a member of the Public Accounts Committee. He had served as the Minister for Telecommunications, Shipping, Surface Transport in the Vishwanath Pratap Singh ministry (1989–90). During his tenure as minister he oversaw the evacuation of Indians during Gulf War.

His only defeat in the constituency came in 1996. Unnikrishnan later quit active politics, shifted his base to New Delhi and then to his ancestral house at Panniyankara in Kozhikode district, and dedicated himself to reading and writing books.

In 1977, he married Amrita Unnikrishnan. They have two daughters.

References

Living people
People from Kozhikode district
Lok Sabha members from Kerala
India MPs 1971–1977
India MPs 1977–1979
India MPs 1980–1984
India MPs 1984–1989
India MPs 1989–1991
India MPs 1991–1996
1936 births
People from Coimbatore
Indian Congress (Socialist) politicians
Indian National Congress (U) politicians
Praja Socialist Party politicians
Indian National Congress politicians from Kerala